Gulliver William McGrath (born 15 August 1998) is an Australian actor.

Life and career 
McGrath played Charlie in the Australian crime series Rush. He also starred as the title character in the Melbourne Theatre Company production Poor Boy alongside Guy Pearce and Abi Tucker.

McGrath portrayed David Collins in the 2012 feature film Dark Shadows, which earned him a 2013 Young Artist Award nomination as Best Supporting Young Actor in a Feature Film. He portrayed Tad Lincoln in Steven Spielberg's Lincoln.

He was born and raised in Melbourne, Australia. He then moved to Birmingham, UK, and was raised there. His mother, Heidi Chapman, is a neuroscientist, and his father, Craig, is an anaesthetist. He is the older brother of actors Zen and Winta McGrath. He portrayed Jerry Hickfang in the 2015 comedy thriller The Voices as the younger version of Ryan Reynolds's character.

Filmography

Film

Television

Stage

Further reading 
 "Young Children As Active Citizens" edited by Glenda Mac Naughton, Patrick Hughes and Kylie Smith, Cambridge Scholars Publishing (2008). Gulliver co-authored a chapter in this book with his brother, Zen McGrath.

References

External links 
 
 Gulliver McGrath at Showcast

1998 births
Australian male child actors
Australian male film actors
Living people